Megacraspedus pusillus is a moth of the family Gelechiidae. It was described by Walsingham in 1903. It is found in Spain.

The forewings are brownish grey, dusted with pale cinereous and devoid of markings, with the exception of a small blackish spot at the end of the cell. The hindwings are pale grey.

References

Moths described in 1903
Megacraspedus